Seawards Journey is a 2003 Uruguayan drama film directed by Guillermo Casanova. It was selected as the Uruguayan entry for the Best Foreign Language Film at the 76th Academy Awards, but it was not nominated.

Cast
 Hugo Arana as Rodriguez
 Julio César Castro as Siete y Tres Diez
 Julio Calcagno as Quintana
 Diego Delgrossi as Rataplán

See also
 List of submissions to the 76th Academy Awards for Best Foreign Language Film
 List of Uruguayan submissions for the Academy Award for Best International Feature Film

References

External links
 

2003 films
2003 drama films
Uruguayan drama films
2000s Spanish-language films
Films set in Uruguay
Films shot in Uruguay